Crambidia roberto is a moth of the family Erebidae. It was described by Harrison Gray Dyar Jr. in 1907. It is found in Mexico.

References

Lithosiina
Moths described in 1907